Fashion Digest is an Australian television series aired 1960–1961 on Sydney station ATN-7, and also aired on Melbourne station GTV-9 (this was prior to the creation of the Nine Network and Seven Network). The series featured Sylvia Rapley, who had a regular segment on the series Your Home. Fashion Digest was a weekly series aired in a 15-minute time-slot.

Rapley gave sewing demonstrations on the series, and advised women on how to dress. The series was produced in Sydney.

See also
Let's Make Clothes

References

External links
Fashion Digest on IMDb

1960 Australian television series debuts
1961 Australian television series endings
Australian non-fiction television series
Black-and-white Australian television shows
English-language television shows